Antonia Terzi (29 April 1971 – 26 October 2021) was an Italian aerodynamicist who worked for the Ferrari and Williams Formula One teams.

Education
Terzi held a Master's degree in Materials Engineering from University of Modena and Reggio Emilia in Italy and a PhD in engineering, focused on aerodynamics, from University of Exeter in the United Kingdom.

Career

Born in Mirandola, Terzi worked in the design department at Ferrari under Rory Byrne until 2001 when she was recruited by Williams to become the team's chief aerodynamicist. Terzi left Williams in November 2004.

She was later employed as an assistant professor by The Delft University of Technology, working together with Professor Ockels at the Faculty of Aerospace Engineering. She was the chief vehicle designer of the TU Delft Superbus.

From 2014 until 2019, she was the head of the aerodynamics team at Bentley Motors Ltd.

In 2020, she was appointed Full Professor at the Australian National University in Canberra, Australia.

Death
Terzi died in a car accident in the UK on 26 October 2021. The exact location and the modalities of the crash have not been disclosed.

References

1971 births
2021 deaths
Aerodynamicists
Academic staff of the Delft University of Technology
Formula One designers
Ferrari people
People from Mirandola
Women automotive engineers
Italian motorsport people
21st-century women engineers
Road incident deaths in England
Williams Grand Prix Engineering